Envoi is a short stanza at the end of a poem.

Envoi may also refer to:
 Envoi (album), an album by Bill Dixon
 Envoi (composition), a single-movement orchestral composition by Christopher Rouse

See also 
 Envoy (disambiguation)